The Black Kei River, originates southwest of Queenstown, and eventually joins the White Kei River, to become the Great Kei River. Several villages are situated on its banks, including McBride Village, Qabi, Ntabelanga, Thornhill, Loudon, Mitford, Basoto, Baccle's Farm and Tentergate.

The Thrift Dam is its only significant reservoir. Presently this river is part of the Mzimvubu to Keiskamma Water Management Area.

Its upper reaches form the western boundary of the Tsolwana Nature Reserve, and during the mid-1800s, the Black Kei and its Klipplaat tributary formed the northern boundary of British Kaffraria. The Klaas Smits and Klipplaat rivers are its main tributaries.

See also 
Great Kei River
 List of rivers of South Africa

References

External links
SA Estuarine Land-cover: Great Kei Catchment
Towns of historical interest in the 'kei

Rivers of the Eastern Cape